Evangeline is a song and the 12th EP by Scottish alternative rock band Cocteau Twins. It was recorded and mixed at September Sound in London, and released in September 1993 by record label Fontana. The song was a moderate hit in several countries and was very popular in Portugal. It was included on the band's seventh studio album, Four-Calendar Café (1993).

Critical reception
Jason Ankeny from AllMusic stated in his review that songs like "Evangeline" "continue the trio's advance into more accessible melodic and lyrical ground without sacrificing even an ounce of their trademark ethereality." Josef Woodard from Entertainment Weekly felt it "have an otherworldly shimmer, a mode perfected by these early architects of dream pop." David Beran from the Gavin Report stated, "Headphones are a must for this sonic picnic and first single from the upcoming´album. Drop into background landscapes of milky way-out keyboards and slivers of airy guitar. Oh, did I mention that the foreground vocals are patent 'Teau Twin ringlets of bliss?" He added that the song "slowly plunges as Frazer's voice soars into a firmament crowded with spacey snippets of computerized sound." Chuck Campbell from Knoxville News-Sentinel described "the gorgeous strains" as "typical Cocteau Twins triumphs, aural massages of magical quality." He also noted that "the instruments supply an air of dreamy melancholia that both chills and warms." 

A reviewer from Lennox Herald complimented it as "a fine effort". American Musician remarked its "sly pop appeal", adding that "the candyland blur of the Cocteaus' sound has never been so alluring". Martin Aston from Music Week declared it as "a slow, stately affair with all their charm and melodic ingenuity intact." R.S. Murthi from New Straits Times felt that a song like "Evangeline" "evince concerns that go beyond the ordinary. And the combination of surreal verbal imagery and atmospheric music makes for an engaging mystique." Ted Drozdowski from Rolling Stone wrote that it "ride gentle guitar-bass-drums grooves that allow Fraser to insinuate her phrases into choruses based on memorable melodies that pack a sweet-tooth rush." Alec Foege from Spin magazine picked it as one of the album's three most successful songs, saying that it "swells with the effects-treated grandeur of Simon Raymonde and Robin Guthrie's accompaniment". In his book The Da Capo Companion to 20th-century Popular Music, Phil Hardy described it as "dreamy". Weisbard and Marks wrote in their Spin Alternative Record Guide, that it is "a song so adult-sounding it could have come from Prefab Sprout."

Music video
The accompanying music video for "Evangeline" was directed by German film director Nico Beyer.

Track listings

Personnel
Cocteau Twins
 Elizabeth Fraser – vocals
 Robin Guthrie – guitar, drum machine
 Simon Raymonde – bass guitar

Production
 Additional engineer – Lincoln Fong
 Original photography – Walter Wick
 Writer, composer and producer – Cocteau Twins

Charts

References

Cocteau Twins albums
1993 EPs
1993 singles
1993 songs
Music videos directed by Nico Beyer